Spooky Movie - The Washington, D.C. International Horror Film Festival (a.k.a. The Spooky Movie Film Festival) is an internationally recognized showcase for independent and underground filmmakers of the horror, science fiction and fantasy genres.

Background

Started in 2006 the festival is one of the largest annual events for horror film fans in the Maryland, Washington, DC, and Virginia area. It is the Mid-Atlantic region's premier dedicated genre film festival.

See also
Count Gore de Vol
Lloyd Kaufman
John Dimes
Steve Niles

References

External links
Creature Feature: The Weekly Web Program, Count Gore De Vol

Film festivals in Washington, D.C.
Film festivals in Virginia
Film festivals in Maryland
Fantasy and horror film festivals in the United States
Science fiction film festivals

Film festivals established in 2006